Category, plural categories,  may refer to:

Philosophy and general uses
Categorization, categories in cognitive science, information science and generally
Category of being
Categories (Aristotle)
Category (Kant)
Categories (Peirce)
Category (Vaisheshika)
Stoic categories
Category mistake

Mathematics
 Category (mathematics), a structure consisting of objects and arrows
 Category (topology), in the context of Baire spaces
 Lusternik–Schnirelmann category, sometimes called LS-category or simply category
 Categorical data, in statistics

Linguistics

Lexical category, a part of speech such as noun, preposition, etc.
Syntactic category, a similar concept which can also include phrasal categories
Grammatical category, a grammatical feature such as tense, gender, etc.

Other
 Category (chess tournament)
 Objective-C categories, a computer programming concept
 Pregnancy category
 Prisoner security categories in the United Kingdom
 Weight class (boxing)
 List of software categories
 Categories (word game)
 Saffir–Simpson hurricane wind scale, a common categorization of hurricane intensities
 Categories of New Testament manuscripts
 Network cable categories: 1, 2, 3, 4, 5/5e, 6/6a, 7/7a (F)
 A classification in a system of compartmentalization (information security)

See also
 
 Categorical (disambiguation)
 Category 1 (disambiguation)
 Category 2 (disambiguation)
 Category 3 (disambiguation)
 Category 4 (disambiguation)
 Category 5 (disambiguation)
 Category 6 (disambiguation)
 Category 7: The End of the World
 Category A (disambiguation)
 Category B (disambiguation)
 Category C (disambiguation)